Lara Jill Miller (born April 20, 1967) is an American actress. She plays Samantha "Sam" Kanisky on the 1980s sitcom Gimme a Break! and as Kathy on The Amanda Show.

She voices the title characters in Clifford's Puppy Days, The Life and Times of Juniper Lee and Henry Hugglemonster, respectively. She voices the character Widget in Wow! Wow! Wubbzy!, Lambie in Doc McStuffins, Fink in OK K.O.! Let's Be Heroes, Lisa Loud in The Loud House, and Libby Stein-Torres in The Ghost and Molly McGee, in addition to Izzie in SciGirls, Allie in Curious George, and Cat in If You Give a Mouse a Cookie.

Early life and education
Miller was born April 20, 1967, in Allentown, Pennsylvania, to Lois (née Noll; 1937-2014) and Stanley Miller. She is Jewish. She first started acting in a dinner theater she found in a newspaper ad, and she did not know what the word audition meant. She asked her Dad what that meant and he told her. She graduated from Allentown's William Allen High School. Her father was  a pajama factory owner and her mother founded the talent agency Star Talent Management.

Career
Miller's professional acting career began on Broadway, where she appeared as Amaryllis in a revival of The Music Man with Dick Van Dyke.

In 1981, after her appearance on Broadway, she joined the cast of Gimme a Break!, playing the role of the tomboyish Samantha "Sam" Kanisky opposite Nell Carter. When the series ended its six-year run on NBC in 1987, Miller returned to New York University, where she played on the university's women's varsity tennis team and continued performing on stage nationally. Four years later, she received her J.D. degree from Fordham University School of Law, leaving graduation early to portray Peter Pan in a production at the Pennsylvania Youth Theater. She subsequently was admitted to practice law in New Jersey, New York, and her native Pennsylvania.

In 1999, Miller resumed her on-camera acting career with recurring roles on the Nickelodeon series The Amanda Show and All That and on General Hospital. She also began working in animated series, lending her voice to various characters, including Kari in Digimon (both the series and the feature film), Koko in Zatch Bell!, Alejo in Astro Boy, and Scheris Adjani in s-CRY-ed. Miller also provided the singing voice of Dorothy Gale in the National Public Radio adaptation of L. Frank Baum's The Wonderful Wizard of Oz, and the voices of the title characters on Cartoon Network's The Life and Times of Juniper Lee, Disney Junior's Henry Hugglemonster, and the PBS Kids Clifford's Puppy Days (prequel to Clifford the Big Red Dog).

Miller appears in the recurring roles of Pookie, Wiki, and Tini on Disney Channel's Higglytown Heroes, Haruka of Daigunder, and the Nick Jr. series Wow! Wow! Wubbzy! as Widget, the show's problem-solving pink creature resembling a rabbit, both PBS series Curious George as Allie and SciGirls as Izzie, and regular guest-starring roles on several other animated series.

For six seasons, she performed voice work on the Disney Channel/Disney Junior television series Doc McStuffins as the voice of Lambie and on the Nickelodeon television series The Loud House in which she voices Lisa Loud, Liam Hunnicutt, Becky, Persephone, and Nurse Patti.

In 2020, she voice acted for two cartoons, the episode "All About Zee" in DC Super Hero Girls and the English dub for Beastars as Haru. She continues to perform the role of Libby in the Disney production, The Ghost and Molly McGee.

Filmography

Live-action

Anime

Animation

Film

Video games

Personal life
In 2006, Miller's mother was diagnosed with frontotemporal dementia, a progressive brain disease, which forced her to close her talent agency; Miller has since helped spread awareness of the disease.

References

External links
 
 
 
 
 

1967 births
Living people
Actresses from Allentown, Pennsylvania
American child actresses
American soap opera actresses
American stage actresses
American television actresses
American video game actresses
American voice actresses
Fordham University School of Law alumni
New Jersey lawyers
New York (state) lawyers
New York University alumni
Pennsylvania lawyers
William Allen High School alumni
20th-century American actresses
21st-century American actresses